Rajpura is a city in Patiala district in the Indian state of Punjab, India, situated along the border of the Indian state of Haryana. It is located 26 KM Patiala city, towards East from District Head Quarter. It is Tehsil Head Quarter. Rajpura is the largest tehsil of the district.

Geography 
It has an average elevation of 259 metres (849 feet).
Rajpura is situated nearly 38 km south west of Chandigarh, the capital city of Punjab. Besides being an important industrial town of Punjab, it also has historical importance.

Rajpura is surrounded by a number of major cities like Patiala (22 km west), Ambala (20 km south) and Ludhiana (83 km north). Rajpura acts as middle point between Amritsar and Delhi on National Highway 44 as these cities are 225 km away from Rajpura in opposite directions.

Demographics 

In the 2011 India census, Rajpura Municipal Council had a population of 391,011 including 206,801 (52.89%) males and 184,210 (47.11%) females giving a Sex Ratio of 891. There were 457,82 children aged 0–6 i.e. 10.7% of the total population. There was a literacy rate of 86.42% (males 89.83%, females 82.70%) much higher than the state average of 75.84%.

History 
The name of Rajpura appears in the history as Emperor Sher Shah Suri. his name when translated means "The Lion King", and founder of the Suri dynasty built a "Sarai" (Inn) in Rajpura for his army when ever he passed through Rajpura. This Sarai was built during the Suri Dynasty, between 1540 and 1545. The Sarai expanded rapidly from the 19th century and is briefly the first largest Administrative Sub-division in Patiala district. This Sarai houses the officers of Sub-Divisional Magistrate.

Municipal Council 
As the city continued to prosper during the 19th century, Rajpura became a tehsil includes 252 villages under its municipal limits and is the largest tehsil of the district. Rajpura has north India's only orphanage center "SOS".

Divisions 
Traditionally, Rajpura can be divided into three divisions: One is Rajpura Township, the second is Old Rajpura and third is Focal Point.

Constituency 

Rajpura is constituency No. 111 of Punjab Legislative Assembly. It is comes under the Patiala (Lok Sabha constituency). As per the voter list of 2019, there are 173947 electorates and 189 polling stations. The term of the Legislative assembly is five years.

Industry 

Rajpura is an industrial town. There are number of large-scale industries like Hindustan Unilever HUL (formerly known as HLL). and a large number of small-scale industries. In small-scale industries, Rajpura is a hub of steel works and machines industry.

Power Plant 

Nabha Power Limited, which runs a 1400 MW (2x700) supercritical thermal power plant at Rajpura, owned and operated by Larsen & Toubro.

Warehousing and logistics hub 
Rajpura has been known for its quality furniture and several well-known brands have their manufacturing plants located here. Being one of the largest industrial hubs of Punjab, Rajpura is crucial location from supply chain & logistics perspective. Rajpura is gradually emerging as warehousing and logistics hub of Punjab.

Education 
Notable schools, colleges, universities and institutes in Rajpura include:

Schools 

 Holy Angels School

Colleges 

 Aryans College of Law
 Chitkara University, Punjab
 Swami Vivekanand Institute of Engineering & Technology

Places of interest

Temple 

The temple is dedicated to Lord Shiva, is located in nalas village. Here the self-born Lingam of Lord Shiv is present, this is why it is called Swayambhu. Since the 15th century temple has been home to Sadhu's. There is an 65 ft-tall sculpture of Lord Shiva at the entrance of the temple and the height of the temple is above 100 ft-long. Every year it's decorated beautifully for the Maha Shivaratri Festival.

Transport

Road 
Rajpura is situated at the junction of National Highway No. 1 which runs from New Delhi to Attari in Punjab and National Highway 64 which runs from Chandigarh to Dabwali, making Rajpura a good distribution centre. Rajpura is regarded as 'Gateway of Punjab' as all road and rail transport needs to touch Rajpura for the routes going to other major cities of Punjab as well as Jammu & Kashmir.

Rail 
 is the first Railway Junction in Punjab while coming from Delhi side. The rail lines are diverted from here to 2 major lines catering to Punjab. One is to Amritsar and Jammu & Kashmir; and the other towards Patiala, Bathinda and Rajasthan.

Air 
The nearest major airport is Chandigarh Airport (IXC / VICG). This airport has domestic flights from Chandigarh and is 28.13 km from the center of Rajpura via NH 7 and NH 205A.

Climate 
Rajpura has the following average temperature and precipitation

References

External links 

 Nalas Temple

Cities and towns in Patiala district